Monument for the 40th Anniversary of King/Emperor Gojong's Enthronement, simply (uncorrectly) Bigak is a pavilion near Gwanghwamun in central Seoul. The pavilion was built in 1902 to commemorate the 40th anniversary (Ruby jubilee) of Emperor Gojong’s coronation and his 50th birthday, as well as the founding in 1897 of the Korean Empire.

See also
Gwanghwamun

References

Jongno District
Buildings and structures in Seoul
Pavilions